Sebastiano Ceccarini (1703–1783), born in Fano, was an Italian Baroque painter. He was a student of Francesco Mancini and the teacher of his nephew Carlo Magini.

Biography
He painted in Rome during the papacy of Pope Clement XII, painting an altarpiece for a chapel the Quirinale, belonging to the Swiss. he retired with a stipend paid by the town of Fano.

He painted an altarpiece, depicting the Madonna and Child with St Francis and St Sebastian and the Castle of Mondolfo in Background, for the church of San Sebastiano in Mondolfo.

Works 

 Portrait of a Noblewoman (ca. 1750), Walters Art Museum, Baltimore 
 Assumption (ca. 1750), Church of Ss. Sergius and Bacchus, Rome
 Allegory of the Five Senses, 1748, Milan, Altomani collection

References

18th-century Italian painters
Italian male painters
Italian Baroque painters
1703 births
1783 deaths
People from Fano
18th-century Italian male artists